Sericoplaga is a monotypic moth genus of the family Crambidae described by William Warren in 1892. Its one species, Sericoplaga externalis, described by the same author in the same year, is found in North America, where it has been recorded from Maryland to Illinois, south to Florida and west to Texas.

Overview
Adults have been recorded on wing in February, from April to October and in December.

The larvae feed on Maclura pomifera.

References

External links

"Sericoplaga Warren, 1892". Butterflies and Moths of the World. Natural History Museum, London. Retrieved February 27, 2018.

Pyraustinae
Moths of North America
Taxa named by William Warren (entomologist)
Crambidae genera
Monotypic moth genera